Richard George William Burrows (born 16 January 1946) is an Irish businessman. He is the chairman of British American Tobacco plc (informally BAT), the world's largest tobacco company by sales, and chief executive of Irish Distillers. In October 2016, Burrows became the chairman of Craven House Capital, an AIM-listed company that specializes in restructuring, expansion and turnaround investments in crisis and transitioning economics.

Early life
Burrows is a graduate of Wesley College (Dublin).

Career
Burrows joined the board of British American Tobacco plc as a non-executive director in September 2009 and became chairman on 1 November 2009. He stood down as chairman and retired from the board at the company's 28 April 2021 AGM, and was succeeded by Luc Jobin.

Burrows was formerly Governor of the Bank of Ireland, a post from which he resigned in June 2009.

Honours and awards
In June 1996, he was made a Chevalier of the French Legion of Honour.

Notes

1946 births
Living people
Chairmen of British American Tobacco
Irish chairpersons of corporations
Chevaliers of the Légion d'honneur
Irish bankers
Irish businesspeople
Irish corporate directors
People educated at Wesley College, Dublin